Daryas (also Romanized as Daryās) is a village in Dehdez Rural District, Dehdez District, Izeh County, Khuzestan Province, Iran. At the 2006 census, its population was 139, in 25 families.

References 

Populated places in Izeh County